(German for View of the Day) is the name of a news and public affairs program shared by three networks in Europe:

  (German TV programme), broadcast by ARD
 , broadcast by Swiss television SRF 1
  (Italian TV programme), broadcast by RAI Sender Bozen in South Tyrol, Italy